The University of Applied Sciences of Central Macedonia / Technological Educational Institute of Central Macedonia (TEICM; Greek: Πανεπιστήμιο Εφαρμοσμένων Επιστημών / Τεχνολογικό Εκπαιδευτικό Ίδρυμα Κεντρικής Μακεδονίας) was a higher-educational institute supervised by the Ministry of Education, Lifelong Learning and Religious Affairs.

It was founded in 1983 and is located in the city of Serres and campuses operate also in Kilkis and Katerini. It was renamed from Technological Educational Institute of Serres (TEISER; Τεχνολογικό Εκπαιδευτικό Ίδρυμα Σερρών) to its current name in 2013. It consists of two schools: the School of Technological Applications, the School of Administration and Economics and the Department of Graphic Arts and Design. In 2019, the TEI of Central Macedonia, the TEI of Eastern Macedonia and Thrace, and the Alexander Technological Educational Institute of Thessaloniki merged into International Hellenic University.

Schools and departments
The ATHENA Reform Plan restructured the institute's departments in 2013.

The university comprises three Schools and seven Departments, to be reduced tο six by 2018.

Academic evaluation
In 2015 the external evaluation committee gave TEI of Central Macedonia a Positive evaluation.

An external evaluation of all academic departments in Greek universities was conducted by the Hellenic Quality Assurance and Accreditation Agency (HQA).

See also 
 List of universities in Greece
 List of research institutes in Greece
 ΤΕΙ of Eastern Macedonia and Thrace
 Education in Greece
 Academic grading in Greece

References

External links
 TEI of Central Macedonia - Official Webpage 
 Hellenic Quality Assurance and Accreditation Agency (HQA) 
 ATHENA Plan for Higher Education  
 TEICM Quality Assurance Unit  
 TEICM DASTA Office (Career Office) 
 TEICM Innovation and Entrepreneurship Unit (I.E.U.) 
 Greek Research & Technology Network (GRNET) 
 okeanos (GRNET's cloud service) 
 synnefo - Open Source Cloud Software (GRNET) 
 Hellenic Academic Libraries Link (HEAL-Link) 

Serres
Technological educational institutions in Greece
Educational institutions established in 1983
1983 establishments in Greece